Today (archaically to-day) may refer to:

 The current day and calendar date

 Now, the time that is perceived directly, present
 Current, present era

Arts, entertainment, and media

Newspapers and websites
 Today (Indian newspaper), a defunct afternoon newspaper
 Today (Jintian), a Chinese literary journal co-founded by Huang Rui
 Today (Singapore newspaper), a Singapore English-language digital news publisher
 Today (UK newspaper), a defunct national newspaper in the United Kingdom
 Today, a Filipino newspaper that was merged with the Manila Standard resulting in the Manila Standard Today
 Florida Today or Today, a U.S. daily newspaper
 Today Newspaper (Gambia), an independent newspaper in the Gambia, West Africa
 Today Newspapers, a defunct newspaper chain in Texas, United States
 Today, the new John Bull, a defunct British magazine
 , an online newspaper published by Citynews (Italy)
 Radio Today (website), a network of websites reporting on radio news and events based in MediaCityUK

Television 
 Today (1960 TV series), an Australian morning television program
 Today (Australian TV program), an Australian breakfast television program
 Today (Thames Television series), a regional news programme shown in the London area, commonly remembered for Bill Grundy's 1976 interview with the Sex Pistols
 Today (American TV program) (also known as The Today Show), an American news and talk morning television show that airs on NBC
 GMTV Today, a defunct UK weekday breakfast programme
 LK Today, a defunct female lifestyle show presented by Lorraine Kelly, succeeded by GMTV with Lorraine
 Today with Maura and Daithi, an Irish TV morning program

Radio 
 Today (BBC Radio 4), BBC Radio 4's early morning news and current affairs programme
 Today Network, a radio network in Australia
 2Day FM, a radio station in Sydney, Australia
 Today FM, an Irish commercial FM radio station which is available nationally
 Today Show Radio, a simulcast of the U.S. Today Show on Sirius Satellite Radio and XM Satellite Radio
 Today Today, an Australian radio show

Films 
 Today (1930 film), a 1930 American drama film directed by William Nigh
 Today (2012 film) or Aujourd'hui, a 2012 French film
 Today (2014 film), a 2014 Iranian film
 To-Day, a 1917 silent drama film

Music

Groups
 Today (group), an American R&B vocal group
 TODAY (production duo), a Canadian record producer team

Albums
 Today (Angela Aki album), or the title song, 2007
 Today (Elvis Presley album), 1975
 Today (Galaxie 500 album), 1988
 Today! (Herbie Mann album), or the title song, 1966
 Today (Johnny Hartman album), 1972
 Today (Junkie XL album), or the title song, 2006
 Today (Marty Robbins album), 1971
 Today! (Mississippi John Hurt album), 1966
 Today (Perry Como album), 1987
 Today! (Skip James album), 1966
 Today (The Statler Brothers album), 1983
 Today (Superpitcher album), 2005
 Today (Today album), 1988
 The Beach Boys Today!, 1965
 Today, by 33Miles, 2010
 Today!, by The Airmen of Note, 1978
 Today, by Gary McFarland, 1969
 Today, by Johnny Maestro & the Brooklyn Bridge, 2004
 Today, by Raul Malo, or the title song, 2001

EPs
 Today (EP), by Everlast, or the title song, 1999
 Today, by Gigi Leung, 1999

Songs
 "Today" (Brad Paisley song), 2016
 "Today" (Gary Allan song), 2009
 "Today" (Jefferson Airplane song), 1967
 "Today" (Mel B song), 2005
 "Today" (The New Christy Minstrels song), 1964
 "Today" (Scooter song), 2014
 "Today" (The Smashing Pumpkins song), 1993
 "Today" (Talk Talk song), 1982
 "Today", by Air
 "Today", by Barry Ryan
 "Today", by Danny Brown from Atrocity Exhibition
 "Today", by Family
 "Today", by Hank Thompson from Country Love Ballads
 "Today", by Joshua Radin from We Were Here
 "Today", by Kim Dong-ryool from Walking With
 "Today", by KMFDM from Adios
 "Today", by Lifehouse from Lifehouse
 "Today", by Mad Caddies from Keep It Going
 "Today", by Poe from the soundtrack of the film Great Expectations
 "Today", by Sandie Shaw
 "Today", by Sugababes from The Lost Tapes
 "Today", by VIXX LR from Whisper
 "Today", by Zero 7 from The Garden
 "T.O.D.A.Y", by Royce da 5'9" featuring Ingrid Smalls from Death Is Certain

Characters
 Today, a character in the Abbott and Costello comedy routine Who's on First?

Other uses
 Today Art Museum, in Beijing, China
 Today sponge, a brand of barrier contraceptive

See also

 Danas (newspaper), a newspaper in Serbia
 Haynt, a defunct Yiddish newspaper in Poland
 Heute, the main evening news program of ZDF in Germany
 Now (disambiguation)
 Present (disambiguation)
Today Today, a song by Cowboys International
 Tomorrow (disambiguation)
 Yesterday (disambiguation)
 Yesterday and Today (disambiguation)
 
 

Days